Rubén Darío Tufiño Schwenk (born January 9, 1970 in Santa Cruz de la Sierra) is a former Bolivian football midfielder who played in the Liga de Fútbol Profesional Boliviano for important clubs, as well as, the Bolivia national team.

Club career
He began playing football at a young age for the prestigious Tahuichi Academy, where he later received a scholarship to play for the University of South Carolina. During his years as a Gamecock Tufiño became one of the most successful players in the school program's history.

After graduating from college, he decided to continue developing his football career and in 1995 he returned to his country to sign with first division club Oriente Petrolero. After two great seasons in Oriente, he transferred to main rival Blooming where he was part of back-to-back national titles. Due to a disagreement in his contract he returned to Oriente Petrolero the following season, before joining the celestes for the second time around in 2001. The following year, Tufiño signed with Bolívar from La Paz, where he spent the next two campaigns and added two more national championships to his resume. After negotiating with The Strongest, he agreed to a one-year-deal with the atigrados which he played for during 2005. Finally, in 2006 he made his third spell with Blooming and by the end of the season he announced his retirement from football.

International career
He also played for the Bolivia national team between 1995 and 2004, scoring 1 goal in 35 international games.

Honours

Club
 Blooming
 Liga de Fútbol Profesional Boliviano: 1998, 1999
 Bolívar
 Liga de Fútbol Profesional Boliviano: 2002, 2004 (A)

References
 
 

1970 births
Living people
Sportspeople from Santa Cruz de la Sierra
Bolivian footballers
Bolivia international footballers
1999 FIFA Confederations Cup players
1997 Copa América players
Bolivian people of German descent
1999 Copa América players
2004 Copa América players
Bolivian Primera División players
Oriente Petrolero players
The Strongest players
Club Blooming players
Club Bolívar players
South Carolina Gamecocks men's soccer players
Association football midfielders